Cornățel or Cornatel may refer to:

 Cornățel, a village in Buzoești Commune, Argeș County, Romania
 Cornățel, a village in Urechești Commune, Bacău County, Romania
 Cornățel, a village in Roșia Commune, Sibiu County, Romania
 Cornățel, a former village in Sâncraiu de Mureș Commune, Mureș County, Romania 
 Cornatel, a town in the municipality of Priaranza del Bierzo, Spain
 Castillo de Cornatel, a castle in the region

See also 
 Cornățelu, a commune in Dâmbovița County, Romania
 Cornea (disambiguation)
 Corneanu (disambiguation)
 Cornel (disambiguation)
 Cornelia (disambiguation)
 Cornești (disambiguation)
 Cornetu (disambiguation)
 Corni (disambiguation)
 Cornu (disambiguation)